Minnie Blanche Bishop (27 December 1864 – 16 October 1917) was a teacher and author in Canada.

Bishop was born and received much of her education in Nova Scotia. She became an advocate for women's rights in education and was one of the first to break the all-male barrier at Acadia College. She received a BA there in 1886 being the only woman in the class. Later she obtained MAs from both Acadia and McMaster.

During a period at McMaster University she came to know Theodore Harding Rand.

References 

 

Canadian women poets
Writers from Nova Scotia
Canadian educators
1864 births
1917 deaths
Canadian women short story writers
Canadian songwriters
19th-century Canadian poets
19th-century Canadian short story writers
Canadian women non-fiction writers
19th-century Canadian women writers
Canadian travel writers